Ragnar Ringstad was a Norwegian cross-country skier who competed in the 1930s. He won a silver medal in the 4 × 10 km relay at the 1938 FIS Nordic World Ski Championships in Lahti.

External links
World Championship results 

Year of birth missing
Year of death missing
Norwegian male cross-country skiers
FIS Nordic World Ski Championships medalists in cross-country skiing